St. John Cemetery may refer to:
 St. John Cemetery, Cincinnati, Ohio
 St. John Cemetery, Queens, New York

St. John's Cemetery may refer to:
 St. John's Cemetery (Dubuque), Iowa
 St. John's Cemetery, Frederick, Maryland
 Saint Johns Cemetery, Union County, South Dakota
 St. John's Cemetery, Halifax, Nova Scotia

See also 
 New St. John's Cemetery
 Old St. John's Cemetery
 Saint John (disambiguation)